Zhou Daxin (born 1952), also known by his pen name Pǔdù. He is a Chinese novelist who was the president of Henan Literature Academy.

Biography
Zhou was born into a family of farming background in Dengzhou, Henan in 1952.

In 1970, after high school, Zhou joined the People's Liberation Army.

Zhou started to publish works in 1979. Zhou graduated from Xi'an Institute of Politics in 1985, then he entered Lu Xun Literary Institute.

Zhou joined the China Writers Association in 1988. In 1999, Zhou became the president of Henan Literature Academy.

Works

Novellas
 Footsteps
 Silver Ornament

Long-gestating novels
 Walking Out of the Basin
 The 21 Building
 Legend of the War
 The Scenery of the Lake and the Mountain
 Early Warning
 Comforting Soul

Short stories
 The Han Chinese Girl
 The Golden Fields of Barley

Drama
 Woman Sesame Oil Maker

Translated works (English)
After the Finale
Fields of Joy
Longevity Park
The Sons of Red Lake

Adaptations
One of his works have been adapted for film:
 Woman Sesame Oil Maker (1992) (directed by Xie Fei)

Awards
 Woman Sesame Oil Maker – Berlin Film Festival Golden Bear Award (1999)
 Fengmu Literature Prize (2002)
 The Scenery of the Lake and the Mountain – 7th Mao Dun Literature Prize (2008)

References

1952 births
People from Dengzhou
Writers from Nanyang, Henan
Living people
Mao Dun Literature Prize laureates
Chinese male novelists
People's Republic of China novelists